Zhou Yang may refer to:

People surnamed Zhou
Zhou Yang (literary theorist) (1908–1989), Chinese literary theorist and Marxist thinker
Zhou Yang (footballer) (born 1971), Chinese female association footballer
Zhou Yang (actress) (born 1985), Chinese actress
Zhou Yang (pole vaulter) (born 1988), Chinese pole vaulter
Zhou Yang (speed skater) (born 1991), Chinese short track speed skater

People surnamed Yang
Yang Zhou (born 1992), Chinese volleyball player